La Jarochita (Spanish for "The Girl from Veracruz" or "The Little Woman from Veracruz") is the ring name of a Mexican luchadora enmascarada, or female masked professional wrestler. She currently works for Consejo Mundial de Lucha Libre (CMLL) where she works as a técnica (fan-favorite character, or Face). She previously worked for Lucha Libre AAA Wrestling where she won the 2012 Quién Pinta Para La Corona ("Who is looking for the crown") talent search. Her legal name is not a matter of public record, as is often the case with masked wrestlers in Mexico where their private lives are out of the public eye.

Championships and accomplishments
Consejo Mundial de Lucha Libre
Mexican National Women's Tag Team Championship (1 time, current) - with Lluvia
Lucha Libre AAA Worldwide
Quién Pinta Para La Corona (2012, Women's division)

Footnotes

References

Living people
Masked wrestlers
Mexican female professional wrestlers
Unidentified wrestlers
1988 births
Mexican National Women's Tag Team Champions
21st-century professional wrestlers